CBS station(s) may refer to:

 Television stations affiliated with the CBS TV network:
 List of CBS television affiliates (by U.S. state)
 List of CBS television affiliates (table)
 CBS Television Stations, the group of CBS's owned and operated stations
 Train stations that have the station code "CBS":
 Coatbridge Sunnyside railway station in Coatbridge, North Lanarkshire, Scotland
 Columbus station, Columbus, Wisconsin, United States

See also
 CBS (disambiguation)